Kurush is a rural locality (a selo) in Khasavyurtovsky District, Republic of Dagestan, Russia. The population was 7,327 as of 2010. There are 133 streets.

Geography 
Kurush is located 24 km northeast of Khasavyurt (the district's administrative centre) by road. Kazmaaul is the nearest rural locality.

References 

Rural localities in Khasavyurtovsky District